Ihor Mykhailovych Miroshnychenko is a Ukrainian sports journalist and far-right politician. Merited Journalist of Ukraine (2006). He was Member of 7th Ukrainian Verkhovna Rada (Ukrainian Parliament) until 27 November 2014.

Biography
Miroshnychenko was born in Lebedyn on February 20, 1976.

He worked for several Ukrainian television channels and was a spokesman for the Ukraine national football team in 2004–2008.

Miroshnychenko became famous for his anti-semitic response to Mila Kunis who said that she felt to be discriminated while living in Chernivtsi and the city is almost a village. He said "Kunis is not Ukrainian, she is a Yid. She is proud of it, so Star of David be with her".

On February 15, 2013 a group of Okhtyrka locals led by Miroshnychenko brought down the Lenin monument in the city.

On 18 of March 2014 Miroshnychenko entered by force into the office of the National Television Company of Ukraine together with other members of Svoboda party. There he assaulted the head of the company Oleksandr Panteleymonov and forced him to write a letter of resignation. Video of this event was published by the Svoboda party press-secretary Alexandr Aronets in his videoblog.

In the 2014 parliamentary election Miroshnychenko was 10th on the election list of his party; since the party came 0,29% short to overcome the 5% threshold to win seats on the nationwide list he was not re-elected into parliament.

References

External links
Biography

1976 births
Living people
People from Lebedyn
University of Kyiv, Journalism Institute alumni
Ukrainian sports journalists
Seventh convocation members of the Verkhovna Rada
Svoboda (political party) politicians
People of the Euromaidan
Far-right politics in Ukraine
Ukrainian nationalists